Diarmuid Ó Cearbhaill, Irish academic, served in the Department of Finance in Dublin before returning to University College Galway to serve as Léachtóir le Geilleagar agus Tráchtáil. He is honorary editor of the Journal of the Galway Archaeological and Historical Society.

Select bibliography

 Galway:Town and Gown 1484-1984, (ed), Galway, 1985.
 From Dooghcloon to Chicago: The Life and Career of Congressman Lawrence E. McGann 1852-1928, pp. 147–166, Journal of the Galway Archaeological and Historical Society, volume 51, 1999.
 Review of Galway - Gaillimh. A Bibliography of the City and County, by Mary Kavanagh, p. 214, J.G.A.& H.S., Volume 53, 2001.
 The Colahans - A Remarkable Galway Family, Diarmuid O Cearbhaill, J.G.A.& H.S, volume 54, 2002, pp. 121–140.
  Galway Spirit: The O'Kellys of Creeraun and Cooloo, pp. 72–95, J.G.A. & H.S., Volume 59, 2007.

Academics of the University of Galway
People from County Galway
Year of birth missing (living people)
Living people
20th-century Irish people
21st-century Irish people